Stirrat is an unincorporated community in Logan County, West Virginia, United States. The southern part of the community is within the Sarah Ann census-designated place.

References

Unincorporated communities in Logan County, West Virginia
Unincorporated communities in West Virginia